Eugene Haustein (April 10, 1907 Detroit, Michigan – June 6, 1984
Sacramento, California) was an American racecar driver.

Haustein drove in 16 AAA Championship Car races between 1930 and 1935, including three Indianapolis 500 starts (1931, 1933, and 1934). In addition he failed to qualify for the Indy 500 in 1932 and drove as a relief driver for Ralph Hepburn in 1935.

Indy 500 results

References

1907 births
1984 deaths
Indianapolis 500 drivers
Racing drivers from Detroit